Kani is both a surname and a given name.

In Tamil Language, the word Kani gives the meaning of fruit. It is also used as name by Tamil people.

Notable people with the name include:

Surname:
 Atandwa Kani (21st century), South African actor
 John Kani (born 1943), South African actor, director and playwright
Karl Kani American fashion designer
 Mohammad-Reza Mahdavi Kani (1931–2014), Iranian cleric and politician
 Kani Saizō (1554–1613), Japanese samurai

Surname:
 Kani Kauahi (born 1959), American footballer
 Kani Vrana (1913–1984), Turkish judge